Thomas Heywood (born 1974) is an Australian concert organist. He is the first Australian musician in history to live as a professional concert organist.

Heywood was born in Melbourne, Australia. He began playing the pipe organ at a very young age and gave his first public performance at age five. He performed at the Sydney Opera House at age 17.

Heywood tours widely and has played a large range of organs in concert halls,
 town halls, cathedrals, festivals and churches around the world.

Heywood has a repertoire of over 5,000 works and has recorded more than 20 albums of organ music, receiving both popular and critical acclaim. He has also transcribed many famous classical and romantic pieces for solo organ and his arrangements are widely performed by other organists.

References

External links 
 Concert Organ International website
 Biography

1974 births
Living people
Australian classical organists
Male classical organists
21st-century organists
21st-century Australian male musicians
21st-century Australian musicians